Andrei Viktorovich Gruzdev (born 21 May 1977 in Kineshma, RSFSR, Soviet Union) is a Russian ski-orienteering competitor and world champion.

Ski orienteering
He received a gold medal in sprint at the 2002 World Ski Orienteering Championships in Borovetz, and a gold medal in the middle distance in Levi in 2005. In 2007 he won a gold medal in the relay event (with Kirill Veselov and Eduard Khrennikov). He has received two individual silver medal and three bronze medals at the world championships.

At the World Cup in Ski Orienteering in 2000 Gruzdev finished overall second, behind winner Eduard Khrennikov.

References

Living people
Russian orienteers
Male orienteers
Ski-orienteers
1977 births
21st-century Russian people